This is a list of notable events in music that took place in the year 1986.

Specific locations
1986 in British music
1986 in Norwegian music

Specific genres
1986 in country music
1986 in heavy metal music
1986 in hip hop music
1986 in jazz

Events
January 30 – The Rock and Roll Hall of Fame in Cleveland, Ohio, holds its first induction ceremony with many rock pioneers attending.
February 25 
The 28th Annual Grammy Awards are presented in Los Angeles, hosted by Kenny Rogers. Phil Collins' No Jacket Required wins Album of the Year, while USA for Africa's "We Are the World" wins both Record of the Year and Song of the Year. Sade win Best New Artist.
 Also, Whitney Houston wins her first GRAMMY award which she won the Best Pop Vocal Performance, Female.
March 8 - For almost a year, Houston's debut album top the charts and remained for 7 weeks and another on May 17.
May 3 – The 31st Eurovision Song Contest, held in Bergen, Norway, is won by Belgium with the song "J'aime la vie", performed by Sandra Kim. At 13 years old, Kim is the youngest-ever Eurovision winner.
May 28 – The Monkees held a press conference at the Hard Rock Cafe in New York City to announce officially that they will embark on a 100-plus city tour. The tour became one of the biggest grossing tours of the year.
June 10 – Bob Geldof is awarded an honorary UK knighthood in recognition of his work in organizing Live Aid and other concerts that raised millions of dollars for the starving people of Africa.
June 15
The final show of the A Conspiracy of Hope benefit concert - organized by Amnesty International - took place at the Giants Stadium in East Rutherford, New Jersey. The show was headlined by U2, Sting, and Bryan Adams, and also features Peter Gabriel, Lou Reed, Joan Baez, and The Neville Brothers.
Also, The Police would perform one last time on stage during the show before disbanding that same year.
June 30 – Madonna releases her "True Blue" album, which tops the charts in over 28 countries & becomes the best selling album of 1986.
August 9 – Queen performed the band's final concert of the Magic Tour at Knebworth Park, which would be the last performance of the band with singer Freddie Mercury and bassist John Deacon. Later Mercury would be diagnosed with AIDS in 1987, passing away in 1991, and Deacon would retire from the band in 1997.
September 27 – A tour bus carrying the heavy metal band Metallica crashes in Sweden, killing their influential bassist, Cliff Burton.
October – Popular music magazine Q is launched in the United Kingdom.
November 17–18 – Billy Eckstine makes his final recordings, later released on his album Billy Eckstine Sings with Benny Carter.
 December 12 – The Smiths play Brixton Academy, the last gig before their dissolution.
 Approximate date – Axé (music) originates in Salvador, Bahia, Brazil.

Bands formed
See Musical groups established in 1986

Bands disbanded
See Musical groups disestablished in 1986

Albums released

January–March

April–June

July–September

October–December

Release date unknown

Annual Waltz - John Hartford
Awaken the Guardian – Fates Warning 
American Girls – American Girls
Armed and Dangerous – Matthew Ward (singer)
As It Is" – Owen Paul
Back in Line – Steeleye Span
Bares y Fondas - Los Fabulosos Cadillacs
Between the Earth & Sky – Luba
The Blind Leading the Naked – Violent Femmes 
Bloodgood – Bloodgood
BTO's Greatest – Bachman–Turner Overdrive
Certain Things Are Likely – Kissing the Pink
Charlotte for Ever – Charlotte Gainsbourg
Chasing Shadows – The Comsat Angels
The Circle & The Square – Red Box
The Colour of Spring – Talk Talk 
Concrete Blonde – Concrete Blonde
Crimson Glory - Crimson Glory
A Date with Elvis – The Cramps
David Foster – David Foster
Discover – Gene Loves Jezebel
Dreaming in Sequence – Chrome
Don't Wait for the Movie – White Heart 
Emotional – Juice Newton
Escape from the Fallen Planet – Crumbächer
Especially for You – The Smithereens
Good Earth – The Feelies
Gruts – Ivor Cutler
Hand to Mouth – General Public
Hey... Bo Diddley in Concert – Bo Diddley with Mainsqueeze
Highlights of a Dangerous Life – The Johnnys
Horse Bites Dog Cries – D.I.
Horse Rotorvator – Coil
House of Miracles – The Vels
Hwgr Grawth-Og – Datblygu
Idle Cure – Idle Cure
In America EP – Britny Fox
Inside – Matthew Sweet
Isyu! – Ebiet G. Ade
Journey to The Urge Within – Courtney Pine (debut)
Keys to Imagination – Yanni
Kings of Punk – Poison Idea
Klymaxx – Klymaxx
The Knife Feels Like Justice – Brian Setzer
The Lace - Benjamin Orr
The Last of the True Believers - Nanci Griffith
Le Mystère des Voix Bulgares – Le Mystère des Voix Bulgares
Le sixième Jour – Dalida
Le Visage de l'Amour – Dalida
Letters Home – News from Babel 
Live Chronicles – Hawkwind 
London 0 Hull 4 – The Housemartins 
Love in Bright Landscapes – The Triffids
Lyle Lovett – Lyle Lovett 
Mad – Raven
The Man – Bill Drummond
Matt Bianco – Matt Bianco 
Mind's Eye – Vinnie Moore

Minuteflag – Minutemen/Black Flag
Nerve War – Front Line Assembly
Nine Lives – Bonnie Raitt
Not of This Earth – Joe Satriani
Nuovi eroi – Eros Ramazzotti
On the Beach – Chris Rea
One Foot in Hell – Cirith Ungol 
Paint Your Wagon – Red Lorry Yellow Lorry
People of the World - Burning Spear
Permanent Sleep – Lowlife
Pictures of Starving Children Sell Records – Chumbawamba
Prince Ivor – Ivor Cutler
R&B Skeletons in the Closet – George Clinton
The Rainmakers – The Rainmakers
Reivax Au Bongo – Hector Zazou
The River is Rising – Greg X. Volz
Romeo Unchained – Tonio K
Running the Endless Mile – John Parr
The Sanctuary – Motherlode
Sex Mad – NoMeansNo
Shakin' Like a Human Being – Kim Mitchell 
Show No Mercy – Bride 
Siempre Contigo – José José
Songs from Liquid Days – Philip Glass
Strange Behavior – Animotion
Streetlight – DeGarmo and Key
Tacky Souvenirs of Pre-Revolutionary America – Culturcide
They Don't Make Them Like They Used To – Kenny Rogers
Thrill of a Lifetime – King Kobra 
Throwing Muses – Throwing Muses
Time's End – Saint (band)
Tones – Eric Johnson
Total Terror – Front Line Assembly
The Touch – Alabama
Transit – Ira Stein and Russel Walder
Tutu – Miles Davis 
U-Vox – Ultravox
Velvet & Steel – Dion DiMucci
Vicious Pink – Vicious Pink
Vicious Rumors – Timex Social Club
Walkabout – The Fixx
Wants You – Rough Cutt
Wear Your Colors – Rick Cua 
The Wedge – Pallas
Weird Love – The Scientists 
Welcome Home – 'Til Tuesday
What Price Paradise - China Crisis
While the City Sleeps... – George Benson
White Fields – The Escape Club
The Wild Frontier – Randy Stonehill
Yemenite Songs – Ofra Haza
Yesterday Started Tomorrow (EP) – Angry Samoans

Biggest hit singles
The following songs achieved the highest chart positions
in the charts of 1986.

Top 40 Chart hit singles

Other Chart hit singles

Notable singles

Other Notable singles

Published popular music
 "All I Ask of You" w.m. Andrew Lloyd Webber
 "Crush On You"     w.m. Jerry Knight & Aaron Zigman
 "I Used To Be An Animal, But I'm Alright Now" w.m. Eric Burdon
 "The Lady in Red"     w.m. Chris de Burgh
 "True Colors" Cyndi Lauper
 Montego Bay Amazulu – a minor hit in the U.S. in September.

Classical music
Malcolm Arnold – Symphony No. 9
Pascal Bentoiu – Symphony No. 7 ("Volume"), Op.29 
Elliott Carter – String Quartet No.4
George Crumb – An Idyll for the Misbegotten (Images III) for amplified flute and percussion (three players).
George Crumb – Federico's Little Songs for Children for soprano, flute/piccolo/alto flute/bass flute, and harp
Mario Davidovsky – Salvos for flute, clarinet, harp, percussion, violin and cello
Jacob Druckman – Reflections on the Nature of Water, for solo marimba
Ludovico Einaudi – Movimento
Peter Eötvös – Chinese Opera
Morton Feldman
For Christian Wolff, for flute and piano/celesta
For Stefan Wolpe, for choir and 2 vibraphones
Lorenzo Ferrero
La fuga di Foscolo
Anemia (film score)
Passacaglia, for flute, clarinet, and string quartet
Intermezzo "Portella della Ginestra"
Ninna-nanna
Karel Goeyvaerts –
De Heilige Stad (The Holy City), for chamber orchestra
De Zeven Segels (The Seven Seals), for string quartet
Martun Israelyan
Violin Concerto
Sonata No. 2 for cello and piano
Wojciech Kilar – Orawa, a symphonic poem for a string orchestra
György Kurtág – Three Ancient Inscriptions, for voice and piano
Alvin Lucier – Hommage to James Tenney, for double bass and pure wave oscillator
Witold Lutoslawski – Chain 3 for orchestra
Per Nørgård
Viola Concerto No. 1 Remembering Child
Najader (The Naiads)
Krzysztof Penderecki – The Song of Cherubin
Paul Schoenfield – Café Music for Piano Trio

Opera
Harrison Birtwistle's opera The Mask of Orpheus is premiered in London, UK on May 21
Rudolf Brucci – Gilgamesh
Lorenzo Ferrero's opera Salvatore Giuliano is premiered at the Teatro dell'Opera di Roma on January 25
Lee Hoiby – The Tempest
Gian-Carlo Menotti – Goya
Michael Nyman – The Man Who Mistook His Wife for a Hat

Jazz

Musical theater
 La Cage aux Folles – London production
 Charlie Girl – London revival
 Chess – London production
 Me and My Girl – Broadway revival
 The Phantom Of The Opera – London production
 Time (musical) – London production
 Sweet Charity – Broadway revival

Musical films
 Absolute Beginners
 HMS Pinafore
 Long Da Lishkara
 Little Shop of Horrors
 Naam
 Otello

Musical television
 Barnum

Music festivals
 Inaugural Festival International de Louisiane

Births
January 1
Lee Sung-min, South Korean singer and actor
Karol Conká, Brazilian rapper and songwriter
January 2 – Trombone Shorty, American trumpet and trombone player
January 3 – Lloyd Polite, American singer (N-Toon)
January 5 – Teppei Koike, Japanese singer and actor
January 6 – Alex Turner, English singer and guitarist (Arctic Monkeys)
January 7 – Megan Washington, Australian musician and singer-songwriter 
January 9 - Wengie,  a Chinese Australian YouTuber, vlogger, pop singer, and voice actress.
January 11 – Mithoon, Indian film score composer and singer
January 17 – Chloe Rose Lattanzi, American singer and actress 
January 20 
 Victoria Asher, American keyboard player
 Kevin Parker,  Australian singer-songwriter, multi-instrumentalist and record producer
January 22 – Ella Edmondson, British musician
January 24 – Raviv Ullman, Israeli-American actor and musician. 
January 26 – Katie Waissel,  English singer-songwriter
January 26
Hero, Korean singer (TVXQ)
Matt Heafy, singer and guitarist (Trivium)
January 28 – Michael Paynter, Australian singer-songwriter and musician (the Veronicas, Delta Goodrem) 
February 2 – Blaine Larsen, American country singer
February 6 – U-Know, Korean singer (TVXQ)
February 14 – Tiffany Thornton, American actress
February 15 – Amber Riley, American actress, stage performer, singer and author
February 19 – Maria Mena, Norwegian singer
February 21 – Charlotte Church, Welsh singer-songwriter, activist and actress
February 23 – Skylar Grey, American singer-songwriter
February 25 – Danny Saucedo, Swedish singer
February 26 
 Crystal Kay, Japanese singer-songwriter, radio host and actress
 Juliet Simms, American singer-songwriter and model (front woman of Automatic Loveletter)
 Oscar Holter, a Swedish record producer and songwriter based in the United States (Taylor Swift, Charli XCX, Hailee Steinfeld, The Weeknd) 
March 3 – Stacie Orrico, American singer-songwriter and occasional actress
March 6 
 Ginny Blackmore, New Zealand singer-songwriter
 Maya Postepski, Canadian musician and producer 
March 9 
 Brittany Snow, American actress, producer and singer
 Young Fyre, American record producer (Britney Spears, Tech N9ne, Jaden Smith) 
March 12 – Danny Jones, British musician, singer and guitarist (McFLY)
March 13 – Rose Elinor Dougall, English singer-songwriter and musician (Mark Ronson, The Pipettes) 
March 14 – Este Haim, American multi-instrumentalist and singer (member of sisterhood and Los Angeles pop rock band Haim) 
March 15 
Adrianne Leon, American actress and singer
Natalie Prass, American singer-songwriter 
March 17 – Andrew Goldstein, American singer-songwriter and record producer
March 18 – Lykke Li, Swedish singer-songwriter and model 
March 20 
 Dean Geyer, South African–Australian singer-songwriter and actor
 Oscar Görres, Swedish songwriter, record producer and musician
 Ruby Rose, Australian model, DJ, recording artist, actress, television presenter, MTV VJ
March 22 – Amy Studt, English singer-songwriter and musician
March 26 
 Jonny Craig, Canadian singer-songwriter
March 28 – Lady Gaga, American singer-songwriter, activist, pianist and actor 
April 2 
Mykki Blanco, American rapper, performance artist, poet and activist
Lee DeWyze, American singer-songwriter
April 4 – Eunhyuk, Korean singer (Super Junior)
April 8
Bridget Kelly, American singer-songwriter
Erika Sawajiri, Japanese actress and singer
 April 9 - Leighton Meester, An American actress, singer and model
April 16 – Penny, American R&B singer (Git Fresh)
April 23
Laura Mvula, British singer
Cirkut, Canadian musician, songwriter and producer (Ava Max) 
April 24 - Kellin Quinn, American singer-songwriter and musician (He is the lead vocalist and keyboardist of the Post-Hardcore band Sleeping with Sirens. Duet with Maggie Lindemann ) 
April 28 – Jenna Ushkowitz, South Korean-born American actress, singer and podcast host
 April 29 - Qveen Herby, American rapper, singer, songwriter and entrepreneur.
April 30 – Dianna Agron, American actress, singer and dancer
May 5 – Bart Baker, American parody artist
 May 8 - Tommy English (producer), American songwriter and producer
May 12 – Emily VanCamp, Canadian French actress, dancer and martial artist
May 13 – Alexander Rybak, Norwegian singer
May 14
Alyosha, Ukrainian singer
Joseph Attieh, Lebanese singer
Amy Shark, Australian indie singer-songwriter and producer 
May 16 – Charlie Fink, British songwriter, producer and filmmaker 
May 17 – Hannah Lux Davis, American music video director 
May 21 
 Myra, American singer
 Da'Vine Joy Randolph, American actress and singer
May 30 – Claudia Beni, Croatian pop singer
May 31 
Sopho Khalvashi, Georgian musician
Waka Flocka Flame, American rapper
June 5 – Gin Wigmore, New Zealand singer-songwriter
June 10 – Tinchy Stryder, English rapper and producer
June 13 – DJ Snake, French DJ and record producer 
June 17 – Lingua Ignota, born Kristin Hayter, American classically trained neoclassical industrial multi-instrumentalist and activist against abuse
June 24 – Solange Knowles, American singer-songwriter, activist, model and actress (Kelly Rowland and Michelle Williams)
June 25 – Aya Matsuura, Japanese singer
June 27 – Drake Bell, American actor/singer/musician
June 28 – Kellie Pickler, American Idol singer
June 29 – Austin Drage, British actor and singer
July 1 = Agnez Mo, Indonesian diva singer, songwriter, dancer, and actress. 
July 2 – Lindsay Lohan, American actress, musician, singer-songwriter, documentary-maker, businesswoman and model (Samantha Ronson, Hilary Duff, Aliana Lohan) 
July 5 – Adam Young, American singer-songwriter and producer (Owl City, Sky Sailing)
July 16 – Misako Uno, Japanese singer (Attack All Around)
July 17 – Jason Aalon Butler, American musician (Letlive, Fever 333, Pressure Cracks), married to Gin Wigmore
July 21 – Rebecca Ferguson, British singer-songwriter
July 28 – Alexandra Richards, American DJ
August 1 – Marissa Paternoster, American artist, singer and guitarist (Screaming Females) 
August 19 – Christina Perri, American singer/songwriter, musician and artist
August 23 
Neil Cicierega, American singer/songwriter, musician (Lemon Demon)
Sky Blu, American rapper, singer, songwriter , record producer, DJ and dancer
August 26
Laza Morgan, singer
Cassie, American singer, dancer
August 27 – Mario, American R&B singer and songwriter
August 28 – Florence Welch, English musician, singer-songwriter, music producer, author, poet and performer (Florence and the Machine)
August 29 – Lea Michele, American singer, actress
September 3 – OMI, Jamaican singer
September 6 - Illy (rapper), Australian rapper 
September 8 – Leah LaBelle, Canadian-born American singer 
September 10  – Ashley Monroe, American country music singer-songwriter (Pistol Annies)
September 12 – Emmy Rossum, American actress and singer
September 12 – Kobasolo, Japanese singer
September 15 
 George Watsky,  American hip hop artist, author and poet (Anna Akana)
 Heidi Montag, American reality television personality, model, singer and actress
September 19 – Ilya Salmanzadeh, Swedish music producer
September 21 – Lindsey Stirling, American violinist, dancer, YouTuber, record producer and performance artist
September 27 – Alison Wonderland, Australian electronic dance music DJ, producer and singer
October 1 – Jurnee Smollett-Bell, American actress and singer 
October 6 – Meg Myers, American singer-songwriter 
October 24 – Drake, Canadian rapper
October 29 – Nataly Dawn, American musician
November 2 – Ryan Hurd, American singer and songwriter
November 3 – Jasmine Trias, Filipino-American singer-entertainer 
November 4 - Alexz Johnson, Canadian musician, actress, and philanthropis
November 5 – BoA, South Korean singer, dancer, songwriter and producer
November 7 – Toro y Moi, American singer-songwriter, record producer and graphic designer
November 8 – Nikola Rachelle, British recording artist and songwriter
November 11 – Jon Batiste, American jazz musician
November 14 - Yuna (singer),  Malaysian singer-songwriter.
November 15 – Jerry Roush, American singer-songwriter (Of Mice & Men, Sky Eats Airplane, Glass Cloud)
November 20 – Oliver Sykes, English heavy metal vocalist, British/Brazilian singer and songwriter (Bring Me the Horizon)
November 21 – Colleen Ballinger, American comedian, actress, singer and YouTube personality
November 25 – Katie Cassidy, American actress, singer, voice actress
December 8 – Kate Voegele, American singer-songwriter and actress
December 11 – Shuta Sueyoshi, Japanese singer
December 15 – Xiah, Korean singer (TVXQ)
December 20 – Anoop Desai, American singer-songwriter
December 30 
 Ellie Goulding, English singer-songwriter
 Caity Lotz, American singer, dancer, actor, martial artist
 Unknown: Samantha McClymont, Australian singer-songwriter (Brooke McClymont)

Deaths
January 4 – Phil Lynott, bassist/singer and co-founder of Thin Lizzy, 36 (heart failure & pneumonia)
January 6 – Joe Farrell, jazz saxophonist, 48 (bone cancer)
January 8 – Pierre Fournier, cellist, 79
February 2 – Francisco Mignone, composer, 88
February 14 – Edmund Rubbra, composer, 84
February 15 – Galliano Masini, operatic tenor, 90
March 4
Richard Manuel (The Band), 42 (suicide)
Howard Greenfield, songwriter, 49 (AIDS)
March 11 – Sonny Terry, blues musician, 74
March 21 – Raymond Burke, jazz clarinetist, 81
March 22 – Mark Dinning, US singer, 52 (heart attack)
March 30 – James Cagney, US actor, singer and dancer, 86
March 31 – O'Kelly Isley of the Isley Brothers, 48 (heart attack)
April 1 – Donald Grobe, operatic tenor, 56
April 3 – Peter Pears, opera singer and partner of Benjamin Britten, 75
April 6 – Boris Gutnikov, violinist, 54
April 8 – Yukiko Okada, singer, 18 (suicide)
April 13 – Dorothy Ashby, jazz harpist and composer, 53 (cancer)
April 19
Dag Wirén, composer, 80
Estelle Yancey, blues singer, 90
June 3 – Anna Neagle, actress, singer and dancer, 81
June 13 – Benny Goodman, bandleader, 77
June 14 – Alan Jay Lerner, lyricist, 67
June 16 – Maurice Duruflé, composer, 84
June 17 – Kate Smith, singer, 79
June 29 – Dusolina Giannini, operatic soprano, 83
July 3 – Rudy Vallee, singer, 84
July 18 – Don Wilkerson, saxophonist
July 31 – Teddy Wilson, jazz pianist, 73
September 27 – Cliff Burton (Metallica), 24 (tour bus accident)
September 28 – Robert Helpmann, dancer and choreographer, 77
October 16 – Arthur Grumiaux, violinist, 65
October 22 – Thorgeir Stubø, Norwegian jazz guitarist, 42
October 29 – Abel Meeropol ('Lewis Allan'), American lyricist, 83
November 1 – Sippie Wallace, blues singer, 88
November 3 – Eddie Davis, saxophonist, 64
November 6 – Elisabeth Grümmer, operatic soprano, 75
November 7 – Tracy Pew, bass guitarist, 28 (brain hemorrhage)
November 13 – Rudolf Schock, operatic tenor, 71
November 18 – Lajos Bárdos, composer and conductor, 87
November 22 – Scatman Crothers, singer, dancer and musician, 76
December 1 – Horace Heidt, pianist and bandleader, 85
December 10 – Kate Wolf, folk singer and songwriter, 44 (leukemia)
December 30 – Charles Magnante, accordionist, composer, arranger, author, and educator, 81

Awards
Rock and Roll Hall of Fame opened; the following artists were the first inductees: Elvis Presley, Chuck Berry, James Brown, Ray Charles, Sam Cooke, Fats Domino, The Everly Brothers, Buddy Holly, Jerry Lee Lewis, Little Richard and record producer Sam Phillips.
Grammy Awards of 1986
1986 Country Music Association Awards
Eurovision Song Contest 1986
28th Japan Record Awards

Charts

List of no. 1 hits
Hot 100 no. 1 hits of 1986 – U.S.

See also
 Record labels established in 1986

References

 
20th century in music
Music by year